Eva Švankmajerová (September 25, 1940 – October 20, 2005) was a Czech surrealist artist. She was born Eva Dvořáková. A native of the Czech town of Kostelec nad Černými lesy, she moved to Prague in 1958 to study at the Prague School of Interior Design and later the Academy of Performing Arts (Theater Department). From 1970, she was an active member of the Czech and Slovak Surrealist Group. She was a painter and ceramicist, and her poetry and prose regularly appeared in the journal Analogon. Most recently, her work has appeared in English in Surrealist Women: an International Anthology (Austin: University of Texas Press, 1998) and Baradla Cave (Twisted Spoon Press, 2001). Švankmajerová was married to the Surrealist filmmaker Jan Švankmajer, with whom she collaborated on such films as Alice, Faust, and Conspirators of Pleasure. They had two children, Veronika and Václav, and lived in Prague until her death from breast cancer in 2005.

Filmography 
 1964 – The Last Trick (orig. Poslední trik pana Schwarcewalldea a pana Edgara) – production assistant, director: Jan Švankmajer
 1967 – The Garden (org. Zahrada) – costume designer, director: Jan Švankmajer
 1971 – Jsouc na řece mlynář jeden – designer, director: J. Brdečka
 1976 – Laterna magika: Ztracená pohádka – designer, director: Jaromil Jireš
 1978 – The Ninth Hearth (orig. Deváté srdce) – visual effects, director: Juraj Herz
 1983 – The Pit, the Pendulum and Hope (orig. Kyvadlo, jáma a naděje) – designer, director: Jan Švankmajer
 1986 – Jost Burgi – Demystifikace času a prostoru – animator, director: M. Havas
 1987 – Laterna magika: Odysseus – animator, director: E. Schorm
 1987 – Alice (orig. Něco z Alenky) – designer, director: Jan Švankmajer
 1994 – Lesson Faust (orig. Lekce Faust) – designer, director: Jan Švankmajer
 1996 – Conspirators of Pleasure (orig. Spiklenci slasti) – designer, director: Jan Švankmajer
 2000 – Little Otík (orig. Otesánek) – designer, director: Jan Švankmajer
 2005 – Šílení – designer, director: Jan Švankmajer

Books 
 Baradla Cave (Jeskyně Baradla) (1995, Edice Analogon) – Original Czech edition
 Baradla Cave (2001,) – English translation
 Anima Animus Animation (1998, Slovart Publishers/Arbor Vitae) – Text in English

See also 
 Surrealism
 Jan Švankmajer
 Women Surrealists

External links

In English
 
 Obituary in The Independent (UK) by Marcus Williamson
 Obituary in The Guardian (UK) by Christopher Masters

In Czech
 Zemřela výtvarnice Eva Švankmajerová BBC Czech
 Eva Švankmajerová (25. 9. 1940—20. 10. 2005) Nekrolog.cz
  Galerie online

In Slovak
 Zomrela Eva Švankmajerová

In French
 Eva Svankmajerova, femme qui a ressuscité le surréalisme
 Décès de l'artiste surréaliste Eva Svankmajerova

1940 births
2005 deaths
People from Prague-East District
Czech animators
Czech women painters
Czech poets
Czech women poets
Czech ceramists
Czech women ceramists
Czech surrealist artists
Surrealist poets
Czech surrealist writers
Czech women animators
Women surrealist artists
Czech women writers
20th-century Czech painters
20th-century Czech women artists
20th-century poets
20th-century women writers
Sun in a Net Awards winners
Jan Švankmajer
Czech animated film directors
Czech animated film producers
Czech graphic designers
Surrealist artists
Deaths from cancer in the Czech Republic
Deaths from breast cancer